The following is a list of FCC-licensed radio stations in the U.S. state of Hawaii which can be sorted by their call signs, frequencies, cities of license, licensees, and programming formats. In addition, several stations in Honolulu also transmit their audio broadcasts on Spectrum Digital Cable for the entire state of Hawaii through local agreements.

List of radio stations

Defunct
 KCOF-LP
 KVOK-FM

References

 
Hawaii
Radio